The 1954–55 Challenge Cup was the 54th staging of rugby league's oldest knockout competition, the Challenge Cup.

First round

Second round

Quarterfinals

Semifinals

Final

This was also the first time that there was an all-Cumbrian Final. Barrow beat Workington Town 21-12 in the final played at Wembley before a crowd of 66,513. Captained by former Great Britain skipper Willie Horne, this was Barrow’s first Challenge Cup final win, although have been runners-up on four other occasions.  Jack Grundy, Barrow's  was awarded the Lance Todd Trophy for man-of-the-match.

Barrow: Clive Best, Jimmy Lewthwaite, Phil Jackson, Dennis Goodwin, Frank Castle, Willie Horne, Edward Toohey, Les Belshaw, Vince McKeating, Frank Barton, Jack Grundy, Reg Parker, and Bill Healey.

References

Challenge Cup
Challenge Cup